Frolands verk is a small village area in Froland municipality in Agder county, Norway. The lake Trevann lies just south of the village.

History
Frolands verk was once a large ironworks in the 1700s which produced cannon balls among other things. The ironworks company included large land holdings of farmland and forests in the surrounding area. The items produced here were shipped down the river Nidelva to the lake Rore in Landvik and then transported to the sea at Grimstad. After 1867, the ironworks was closed and converted into a sawmill. Today, the main buildings of the company are owned by the municipality and used as a cultural centre.

References

Villages in Agder
Froland